Trochogyra is a genus of small air-breathing land snails, terrestrial pulmonate gastropod mollusks in the family Charopidae.

Species
Species within the genus Discocharopa include:
 Trochogyra leptotera

References

 GBIF info for the authority and date

 
Charopidae
Taxonomy articles created by Polbot